Data-driven testing (DDT), also known as table-driven testing or parameterized testing, is a software testing methodology that is used in the testing of computer software to describe testing done using a table of conditions directly as test inputs and verifiable outputs as well as the process where test environment settings and control are not hard-coded. In the simplest form the tester supplies the inputs from a row in the table and expects the outputs which occur in the same row. The table typically contains values which correspond to boundary or partition input spaces. In the control methodology, test configuration is "read" from a database.

Introduction
In the testing of software or programs, several methodologies are available for implementing this testing. Each of these methods co-exist because they differ in the effort required to create and subsequently maintain. The advantage of Data-driven testing is the ease to add additional inputs to the table when new partitions are discovered or added to the product or system under test. Also, in the data-driven testing process, the test environment settings and control are not hard-coded. The cost aspect makes DDT cheap for automation but expensive for manual testing.

Methodology overview
Data-driven testing is the creation of test scripts to run together with their related data sets in a framework. The framework provides re-usable test logic to reduce maintenance and improve test coverage. Input and result (test criteria) data values can be stored in one or more central data sources or databases, the actual format, organization and tools can be implementation specific.

The data comprises variables used for both input values and output verification values. In advanced (mature) automation environments data can be harvested from a running system using a purpose-built custom tool or sniffer, the DDT framework thus performs playback of harvested data producing a powerful automated regression testing tool.

Automated test suites contain user's interactions through the system's GUI, for repeatable testing. Each test begins with a copy of the "before" image reference database. The "user interactions" are replayed through the "new" GUI version and result in the "post test" database. The reference "post test" database is compared to the "post test" database, using a tool. Differences reveal probable regression.

Navigation through the program, reading of the data sources, and logging of test status and information are all coded in the test script.

Data driven
Anything that has a potential to change (also called "variability," and includes elements such as environment, end points, test data, locations, etc.) is separated out from the test logic (scripts) and moved into an 'external asset'. This can be a configuration or test dataset. The logic executed in the script is dictated by the data values.

Keyword-driven testing is similar except that the logic for the test case itself is encoded as data values in the form of a set of "action words", and not embedded or "hard-coded" in the test script. The script is simply a "driver" (or delivery mechanism) for the data that is held in the data source.

The databases used for data-driven testing can include:
 Data pools
 DAO objects
 ADO objects

See also

 Control table
 Keyword-driven testing
 Test automation framework
 Test-driven development
 Metadata-driven testing
 Modularity-driven testing
 Model-based testing

References

 Carl Nagle: Test Automation Frameworks, Software Automation Framework Support on SourceForge , Data-driven testing approach 

Software testing